Tecomanthe burungu, commonly known as Roaring Meg Creek trumpet vine or pink trumpet vine, is a climber native to Queensland, Australia. The taxon was recorded in the Australian Plant Census in 2010 as Tecomanthe sp. Roaring Meg and formally described in 2018. Plants are cultivated for their ornamental pink tubular flowers.

References

Bignoniaceae
Flora of Queensland
Plants described in 2018